
Warawara (Aymara warawara star, also spelled Wara Wara) is a  lake in Bolivia. It is situated in the Oruro Department, Sebastián Pagador Province, which is identical to the Santiago de Huari Municipality. The river Jach'uyu (Aymara for "big corral", Jachuyo) originates at the lake. It flows to the north-east.

References 

Lakes of Oruro Department